Glenea bivittata is a species of beetle in the family Cerambycidae. It was described by Per Olof Christopher Aurivillius in 1903 and is known to be from the Philippines.

References

bivittata
Beetles described in 1903